KNHS may refer to:

Koninklijke Nederlandsche Hoogovens en Staalfabrieken, Netherlands based steelmaker
Keystone National High School
 KNHS-LP, a low-power radio station (93.1 FM) licensed to serve Lafayette, Louisiana, United States
 KNHS (California), a former high school radio station in Torrance, California, United States; a defunct radio station
 Kingsgrove North High School, a high school in Sydney, Australia
  (KNHS), Dutch National Equestrian Federation